For the Fans Volume 1 is  a mini-album of six tracks by the artist Bizzy Bone, released on July 2, 2005. Only 1,000 copies were pressed.

The album has production by Beat Brothers and guest appearances by 7 Sign Regime members.

Track listing

Bizzy Bone albums
2005 albums